The third season of the television series Live PD  began airing on September 21, 2018 on A&E. The season concluded on August 24, 2019 and contained 90 episodes.

Departments returning from season two 

Richland County (SC) Sheriff's Department
Pasco County (FL) Sheriff's Office
Greene County (MO) Sheriff's Office
Warwick (RI) Police Department
Nye County (NV) Sheriff's Office
El Paso (TX) Police Department
Mission (TX) Police Department
Slidell (LA) Police Department

All departments cited from the following sources:

Department debuting in season three 

Salinas (CA) Police Department
Franklin County (OH) Sheriff's Office
Williamson County (TX) Sheriff's Office
Oklahoma Highway Patrol
Lawrence (IN) Police Department
U.S. Marshal Service (NY)
East Providence (RI) Police Department
Santa Fe (NM) Police Department
Lafayette (LA) Police Department

All departments cited from the following sources:

Notes 
 Italics indicate a department is not currently featured, but has promised to return later in the season.

Episodes 
Season three premiered on September 21, 2018.

References 

Live PD
2018 American television seasons
2019 American television seasons